is a Japanese volleyball player who plays for Pioneer Red Wings. She also plays for the All-Japan women's volleyball team.

Yoshida played for the All-Japan team for the first time at the Montreux Volley Masters in May 2013.

Clubs
  Saigawa Junior High
  Hakata Girls' Highschool
  Pioneer Red Wings (2005-)

Awards

Clubs
2008 Empress's Cup -  Runner-Up, with Pioneer Red Wings

References

External links
 V.League - Profile

Japanese women's volleyball players
Living people
1986 births
Sportspeople from Fukuoka Prefecture